Zinc finger protein 556 is a protein that in humans is encoded by the ZNF556 gene.

References

Further reading